The seventh season of RuPaul's Drag Race began airing on March 2, 2015. RuPaul and Michelle Visage returned as judges, while the space previously occupied by Santino Rice was filled by new additions Ross Mathews and Carson Kressley. Matthews and Kressley were only both present for the season premiere and took turns sharing judging responsibilities. Shawn Morales, a member of the Pit Crew since the third season and Simon Sherry-Wood, a member in the sixth season, did not appear this season and were replaced by Bryce Eilenberg. Like the previous two seasons of RuPaul's Drag Race, the season featured 14 contestants competing for the title of "America's Next Drag Superstar", a one-year supply of Anastasia Beverly Hills cosmetics and a cash prize of 100,000 dollars. The season premiere debuted with a live and same-day viewership of 350,000, a 20% increase from the previous season. On March 20, 2015, it was announced that LogoTV had given the series an early renewal for an eighth season.

The theme song played during the runway segment every episode was "Sissy That Walk". Season 6 also featured "Sissy That Walk" as a runway song, making Season 7 the only season to reuse a runway song. The song played during the closing credits was "Fly Tonight", both songs from the album Born Naked.

The winner of the seventh season of RuPaul's Drag Race was Violet Chachki, with Ginger Minj and Pearl being the runners-up.

Contestants 

(Ages, names, and cities stated are at time of filming.)

Contestant progress

Lip syncs
Legend:

Guest judges 
Listed in chronological order:

Kathy Griffin, comedian
Olivia Newton-John, actress and singer
Jordin Sparks, singer and actress
Mel B, singer
Kat Dennings, actress
Jessica Alba, actress
Lucian Piane, composer and music producer
Isaac Mizrahi, fashion designer
Merle Ginsberg, journalist
Ariana Grande, singer and actress
Tamar Braxton, singer and television personality
Michael Urie, actor
LeAnn Rimes, singer
Nelsan Ellis, actor
Demi Lovato, singer and actress
John Waters, director
Alyssa Milano, actress
Rachael Harris, actress and comedian
Santino Rice, fashion designer
Rebecca Romijn, actress

Special guests
Guests who appeared in episodes, but did not judge on the main stage:

Episode 1:
Alaska, runner-up of season 5
Mathu Andersen, photographer and makeup artist
Magnus Hastings, photographer
Episode 2:
Moby, musician
Jamal Sims, choreographer
Episode 7:
Bianca Del Rio, winner of season 6
Episode 8:
Latrice Royale, "Miss Congeniality" of season 4 and contestant on All Stars season 1. 
Episode 10:
Kym Johnson, professional dancer
Episode 12:
Candis Cayne, choreographer

Episodes

Soundtrack
The trailers for this season featured clips of the songs "Geronimo" and "Modern Love", both of the album Born Naked.

RuPaul Presents: CoverGurlz 2 

RuPaul Presents: CoverGurlz 2 is a 2015 compilation album by entertainer RuPaul, featuring the season 7 cast of his show RuPaul's Drag Race. The album was released digitally on February 3, 2015.

Background
Similar to last season, the compilation consists of 14 covers of songs previously released by RuPaul, performed by all of the RuPaul's Drag Race season seven contestants. It features tracks originally from RuPaul's albums Born Naked, Glamazon, Red Hot, Starrbooty: Original Motion Picture Soundtrack, SuperGlam DQ.

Track listing 
All songs were written by RuPaul Charles and Lucian Piane, with the exception of tracks fifteen and sixteen, which were written solely by Charles himself.

Ratings

See also 

 List of Rusicals

References

External links 
  (U.S.)
  (Canada)
 Official Facebook page
 Ratings

2015 American television seasons
RuPaul's Drag Race seasons
2015 in LGBT history